Trensmat Records was an independent record label based in Ireland. It specialised in drone, noise music, krautrock and grooves. All releases were on vinyl in limited editions.

The label's name was a made up word, based on "transmit." Making up a word for the label name tied in with the "every noise has a note" tagline on earlier releases. Having a made-up word for the label name also made the label name appear sooner in Internet searches.

TR020, one of the label's releases, marked the end of the first phase of the label in which it had grown to be internationally distributed - a move away from its traditional method of small-run handmade editions sold directly to its mailing list and handful of shops. This phase nearly finished the label and it took 18 months out to rebuild and re-launched in 2011. That year saw it return to its original concept to great success with three sets of very well received 7"s.

Artists associated with the label include The Telescopes, Mugstar, AreaC, Magnetize, Heavy Winged, Circle, Astral Social Club, The Shining Path, Cave, Cheval Sombre, Mudhoney, Acid Mothers Temple, White Hills, Kinski, Bardo Pond, GNOD, Astral Social Club

Discography
The Telescopes - Night Terrors 7" (TR001) August 2006
Mugstar - Bethany Heart Star 7" (TR002) February 2007
The Telescopes - Psychic Viewfinder 7" (TR004) May 2007 
Area C - Trick with a Knife 7" (TR003) June 2007
Magnetize - Noise to Signal 7" (TR005) July 2007 
Heavy Winged - On the Marble Cliffs 7" (TR006) August 2007
Circle - Vaahto 7" (TR007) December 2007 
The Telescopes - Another Whip 7" (TR008) December 2007 
Astral Social Club - Skelp/Ginnel 7" (TR009) April 2008
The Shining Path - Live at the Voltaire Commune 7" (TR010) April 2008
Cave - Live at the Voltaire Commune 7" (TR011) April 2008
Cheval Sombre - Live at the Voltaire Commune 7" (TR012) April 2008
Mudhoney / Mugstar - Sonic Attack (Motorheads) 7" (TR013) November 2008
Acid Mothers Temple & The Cosmic Inferno / White Hills - Sonic Attack (Psychedelic Warlords) 7" (TR014) November 2008
Kinski / Bardo Pond - Sonic Attack (Lords of Light) 7" (TR015) November 2008
Expo'70 - Sunglasses 7" (TR016) January 2009
Black to Comm - Incidents 7" (TR017) January 2009
Mugstar - Today Is the Wrong Shape 7" (TR018) August 2009
Our Love will Destroy the World - Yellow Nirvana 7" (TR019) August 2009
Various - Every Noise Has a Note CD LP (TR020) December 2009
Astral Social Club - Snaefell 7" (TR021) April 2011
Evan Caminiti - Distant Lights 7" (TR022) April 2011
Ashtray Navigations - 3 Rockets Thicken 7" (TR023) August 2011
White Hills - Measured Energy 7" (TR024) August 2011
Carlton Melton / Mugstar - Company / Black Fountain 7" (TR025) December 2011
Tlaotlon / Whirling Hall Of Knives - Attitudes Blankets To Nada / Synapse Snaps 7" (TR026) December 2011
Tlaotlon - Squirt Image Flex LP (TR027) February 2012
The Telescopes - Black Eyed Dog 7" (TR028) May 2012
Cheval Sombre - Couldn't Do 7" (TR029) May 2012
GNOD - 5th Sun 7" (TR030) July 2012
Whirling Hall Of Knives - Alternate Devil 7" (TR031) July 2012
Cloudland Canyon - Born Blonde 12" (TR032) November 2012
A.M - Black Night Burning LP (TR033) December 2012
GNOD - Presents.. Dwellings & Druss LP (TR034) February 2013
The 15 Dead Minutes - Scheming Things 12" (TR035) April 2013
Whirling Hall Of Knives - Devisions LP (TR036) 2013 		
My Cat Is An Alien - Alien, All Too Alien LP (TR037) 2013 		
Astral Social Club - Electric Yep LP (TR038) 2013 		
Dwellings - Don't Say Nothing LP (TR039) 2013 		
Stave - Trust 12" (TR040) 2013 		
AM - Dragonfly LP (TR041) 2014 		
Love Cult Take Druss - Yr Problems LP (TR042) 2014 		
Stefan Jaworzyn - Principles Of Inertia LP (TR043) 2014 		
Valved - AnD / WHOK Remixes 12" (TR044) 2014 		
Sunil Sharpe - Cadya 12" (TR045) 2014

See also
 List of record labels

External links
 Official site

Irish independent record labels
Record labels established in 2006
Experimental music record labels
Noise music record labels